Duncan MacIntyre or Duncan McIntyre may refer to:

 Duncan Ban MacIntyre (1724–1812), Scottish Gaelic poet
 Duncan MacIntyre (New Zealand politician) (1915–2001), New Zealand politician
 Duncan McIntyre (businessman) (1834–1894), Canadian businessman
 Duncan McIntyre (explorer) (1831–1866), Australian explorer
 Duncan A. McIntyre, American aviation pioneer
 Duncan John McIntyre (1842–1920), Canadian lawyer and political figure from Ontario